Lu Kuo-hua (born 22 February 1956) is a politician in the Republic of China. He was the Magistrate of Yilan County from 2005 to 2009.

Yilan County Magistrate

2005 Yilan County magistrate election
Lu was elected Magistrate of Yilan County after winning the 2005 Republic of China local election as the Kuomintang candidate on 3 December 2005. He took office on 20 December 2005.

2009 Yilan County magistrate election
Lu joined the 2009 Republic of China local election on 5 December 2009 representing the Kuomintang. However, he lost to Democratic Progressive Party candidate Lin Tsung-hsien.

References

External links

 

1956 births
Living people
People from Toucheng, Yilan County, Taiwan
Magistrates of Yilan County, Taiwan
Kuomintang politicians in Taiwan
Fu Jen Catholic University alumni
National Taiwan University alumni